Franca Basquetebol Clube (English: Franca Basketball Club), also known as Sesi/Franca for sponsorship reasons, is a Brazilian men's professional basketball club that is based in Franca, São Paulo state. It was founded on May 10, 1959. The club won the South American Club Championship six times.

History
The club was a two-time FIBA Intercontinental Cup runner-up: in 1975 (as Esporte Clube Amazonas Franca), and in 1980 (as Associação Atlética Francana).

Achievements and honors

Worldwide
FIBA Intercontinental Cup
Runners-up (2): 1975, 1980

Latin America
Pan American Club Championship 
Champions (4): 1993, 1994, 1997, 1999 (record)
Runners-up (1): 1996

Continental
South American Club Championship 
Champions (6): 1974, 1975, 1977, 1980, 1990, 1991
Runners-up (3): 1978, 1992, 1993
FIBA South American League 
Champions (1): 2018
Runners-up (2): 1998, 2007

National
Brazilian Championship 
Champions (12): 1971, 1974, 1975, 1980, 1981 (II), 1990, 1991, 1993, 1997, 1998, 1999, 2022 (record)
Runners-up (9): 1979, 1981 (I), 1982, 1986, 1989, 1994, 2007, 2011, 2019
Super 8 Cup
Winners (1): 2020
Runners-up (1): 2018
Brazilian Supercup 
Winners (1): 2008

Regional
São Paulo State Championship 
Champions (15 - record): 1973, 1975, 1976, 1977, 1988, 1990, 1992, 1997, 2000, 2006, 2007, 2018, 2019, 2020, 2022
Runners-up (13): 1964, 1970, 1971, 1974, 1978, 1979, 1980, 1991, 1993, 1996, 1999, 2008, 2017, 2021

Current roster

Notable players

 Rafael "Bábby" Araújo
 Fúlvio de Assis
 Leandrinho Barbosa
 Murilo Becker
 Vítor Benite
 Lucas Cipolini
 Elio Corazza
 Roberto "Robertão" José Corrêa
 Lucas Dias
 Gilson Trinidade de Jesus
 Marco Aurélio Pegolo dos Santos (Chuí)
 Wagner da Silva
 Josuel dos Santos
 Nezinho dos Santos
 Demétrius Ferraciú
 Francisco Sérgio García
 Zé Geraldo
 Jorge Guerra
 Rafael Hettsheimeir
 Rogério Klafke
 Marquinhos Leite
 Tato Lopez
 Didi Louzada
 Sílvio Malvezi
 Rafael Mineiro
 Fernando Minucci
 Adilson Nascimento
 Jimmy de Oliveira
 Paulão Prestes
 Hélio Rubens
 Helio Rubens Filho
 Toto
 Anderson Varejão
 Marcelo Vido
 Marcos Mata
 Leonel Schattman
 José Vargas
 Eddie Basden
 Dexter Shouse
 Rocky Smith
 David Jackson

Head coaches 
 Pedro "Pedrocão" Morilla Fuentes: (1959–1981) 
 Hélio Rubens: (1981–2000) 
 Daniel Abrão Wattfy: (2000–2004) 
 Marco Aurélio "Chuí" Pegolo dos Santos: (2004–2005) 
 Hélio Rubens: (2005–2012) 
 Lula Ferreira: (2012–2016) 
 Helinho: (2016–present)

Official club names
The club adopted several different names during its history:

Clube dos Bagres (1959–1971)
Emmanuel Franca Esporte Clube (1972–1974)
Esporte Clube Amazonas Franca (1975–1977)
Associação Atlética Francana (1977–1984)
Associação Francana de Basquetebol (1984–1988)
Ravelli Franca Basquetebol (1988–1991)
Franca Basquetebol Clube (1992–)

Since the foundation of Franca Basquetebol Clube (the club's current form), in 1992, the club has regularly changed its name according to its name sponsor:

All Star/Franca (1992)
Satierf/Sabesp/Franca (1993)
Cosesp/Franca (1994)
Cougar/Franca (1996)
Marathon/Franca (1997–2000)
Unimed/Franca (2000–2001)
Franca Basquetebol Clube (2001–2004, 2015-)*
Franca/Petrocrystal/Ferracini (2004–2005)
Franca/Mariner/Unimed (2005–2006)
Unimed/Franca (2006–2008)
Vivo/Franca (2008–2015)
Sesi/Franca (2017–)

* Without an official sponsor.

References

External links
Official website 
Latinbasket.com Team Profile

Basketball teams in Brazil
Basketball teams established in 1959
Novo Basquete Brasil
Basketball in São Paulo (state)